This is a list of properties and districts in Columbia County, Georgia that are listed on the National Register of Historic Places (NRHP).

Current listings

|}

References

Columbia
Buildings and structures in Columbia County, Georgia